Henry Hart may refer to:

 Henry Hart (died c. 1578) (1531–1578), MP for Old Sarum in 1559
 Henry Hart (soldier) (1566–1637), English soldier who settled in Ireland
 Henry Hart (Royal Navy officer) (1781–1856), British naval officer and diplomat
 Henry Chichester Hart (1847–1908), Anglo-Irish botanist and explorer
 Henry George Hart (1808–1878), British Army officer and founding author of Hart's Army List
 Henry Hart (musician) (1839–1915), African-American musician from Indiana
 Henry Hart (author) (born 1954), American poet and author
 Henry M. Hart Jr. (1904–1969), American legal scholar
 Henry Hart (Kid Danger), Character of Henry Danger TV Series

See also
 Henry Hickman Harte (1790–1848), Irish mathematician
 Harry Hart (disambiguation)
 Henry Hert, MP for Melcombe Regis in 1388